IRAS 05437+2502 is a reflection nebula in the constellation Taurus.

Astronomers think that a young star coming from the nebula could have been traveling at 124,000 mph and may of caused its distinctive "boomerang" shape when it passed through.

References

Taurus (constellation)
Reflection nebulae
IRAS catalogue objects